Gujan (also Romanized as Goūjān; also known as Goūgūn, Goujūn, and Kūjān) is a city in the Central District of Farsan County, Chaharmahal and Bakhtiari province, Iran. At the 2006 census, its population was 5,468 in 1,289 households, when it was a village. The following census in 2011 counted 5,881 people in 1,563 households. The latest census in 2016 showed a population of 6,179 people in 1,780 households, by which time the village had been elevated to the status of a city. The city is populated by Lurs.

References 

Farsan County

Cities in Chaharmahal and Bakhtiari Province

Populated places in Chaharmahal and Bakhtiari Province

Populated places in Farsan County

Luri settlements in Chaharmahal and Bakhtiari Province